G News Network, commonly known as GNN, is a Pakistani 24-hour news and current affairs channel based in Lahore, Pakistan. It is owned and operated by Gourmet Foods.

It was launched in 2005 as CNBC Pakistan under a license from CNBC Asia Pacific. It was then owned by Vision Network Television Limited. In 2015, it was renamed as Jaag TV and was relaunched. In 2018, it was again relaunched with a new name GNN.

History

It started its transmission under name of CNBC Pakistan by taking a license from CNBC Asia. It was then owned by Vision Network Television.

In 2015, it was relaunched as Jaag TV after struggling to compete in the Pakistani market. The channel continued to struggle and was bought by Pakistani bakery company, Gourmet Bakeries. Reportedly, they bought it for 1.5 billion to diversify their business.

In 2018, the company announced its intention to rename the channel and relaunch it under the name, G News Network. For this purpose, they appointed Amir Mir, brother of journalist and anchor Hamid Mir, as the Chief Operating Officer (COO) of the channel.

On 10 August 2018, Hamid Mir left Geo TV and joined GNN as President of the channel along with two other colleagues Sohail Warraich and Munib Farooq. But his stint remained brief at GNN as two months later on 12 October 2018, Hamid Mir left GNN.

Senior journalist Dr. Shahid Masood joined GNN as President on 14 April 2019, continuing his show Live With Dr. Shahid Masood.

Senior journalist Arif Hameed Bhatti joined GNN as Chief operating officer (COO) on 13 June 2019. He will host a show at GNN.

Shows
Khabar Hai (Arif Hameed Bhatti, Saeed Qazi and Tahir Malik)
Live With Dr Shahid Masood (Shahid Masood; anchor: Zaryab Arif , earlier Mehr U. Sher, Naila Ali, Samina Pasha)
 Clash with Aisha Yousaf
 China Today
 Joke Dar Joke (Hina Niazi)
 Fard-e-Jurm
 Face to Face with Ayesha Bakhsh
View Point (Imran Yaqub Khan, Samina Pasha and Zafar Hilaly)
 G Kay Sung (Mohsin Bhatti)
 Taron Sy Karain Batain (Fizza Ali)
 Food Street
 Aisa Dais Hai Mera
 Nagar Nagar ki Khabar
 News Edge
 Global Insight

Former shows
 Aashkar
 Bebaak
 Clash with Aisha Yousaf
 Hamid Mir Show
 Inside Out

See also
List of television stations in Pakistan
List of news channels in Pakistan

References

Television stations in Pakistan
24-hour television news channels in Pakistan
Television stations in Lahore
CNBC global channels
Mass media in Karachi
Television channels and stations established in 2005